The humanist and theologian Jacob Ziegler (c. 1470/71 — August 1549) of Landau in Bavaria, was an itinerant scholar of geography and cartographer, who lived a wandering life in Europe. He studied at the University of Ingolstadt, then spent some time at the court of Pope Leo X before he converted to Protestantism; subsequently his geographical works were placed on the Index Librorum Prohibitorum.

For a time he taught at Vienna; in his old age, 1545–49, he lived in the house of Wolfgang Salm, Bishop of Passau. His portrait by Wolf Huber (c. 1485-1553), executed about 1540, when he was about seventy years old, is in the Kunsthistorisches Museum, Vienna.

His main geographical treatise, Schondia, was published under the title Quae intus continentur Syria, Palestina, Arabia, Aegyptus, Schondia, Holmiae... at Strasbourg in 1532.

Notes

1470 births
1549 deaths
German scholars
History of geography
Medieval German geographers
15th-century German scientists
15th-century geographers
16th-century geographers
15th-century German writers
16th-century German writers
16th-century German male writers
German Renaissance humanists